Hans Walter Kosterlitz FRS (27 April 1903 – 26 October 1996) was a German-born British biochemist.

Biography

Hans Walter Kosterlitz was born on 27 April 1903 in Berlin. He was the elder son of Bernhard Kosterlitz, a physician,  and Selma Helena Lepman.

Kosterlitz’s father had recommended a career in law. He gave it a try for six months at the University of Berlin, but then switched to medicine. He graduated in 1928 and worked in the department of Wilhelm His. From 1930-33 he was an assistant at the Charité hospital, University of Berlin, where he worked in the radiology department. His daytime job in clinical radiology funded his evening researches in the laboratory, where he developed an interest in carbohydrate metabolism.

In 1933 Adolf Hitler passed the Law for the Restoration of the Professional Civil Service, which applied to non-Aryans. Later a similar law was passed to cover all lawyers, doctors and other professions. Kosterlitz, who had Jewish ancestry, contacted John Macleod, FRS in Aberdeen, who managed to accumulate some modest funding, sufficient for him to reply ‘come to Aberdeen … but no guarantee of a secure job’.  Kosterlitz arrived the following March.

Soon after Macleod’s untimely death on 16 March 1935, Kosterlitz was awarded the first ever project grant (£50) from the newly-founded Diabetic Association. He later received his first grant from the MRC.

On 9 March 1937 he married Johanna Maria Katharina Greßhöner, known as Hanna, a friend from Berlin who had arrived in Scotland in 1935. Both Kosterlitz parents and their younger son Rolf moved to the UK in 1939, and lived at 110b Banbury Road, Oxford. The 1939 National Register shows Bernhard as a medical referee for an insurance company. Hans and Hanna had a son, John Michael, now Professor of Physics at Brown University, who won the Nobel Prize in Physics in 2016

Over the years Hans Kosterlitz was a Carnegie Teaching Fellow, Lecturer, Senior Lecturer, and finally Reader. In 1968, Aberdeen established a new Department of Pharmacology, which was headed by Kosterlitz as professor until 1973, when he became director of the university's drug addiction research unit.

Kosterlitz is best known for his work as one of the key discoverers of endorphins. He stimulated the mouse isolated vas deferens electrically and recorded its contractions with a polygraph. He then found that if you added opiates to the solution, the muscle would not contract.  Opiates inhibited the contraction. Those contractions were later found to resume in the presence of both opiates and an antagonist such as naloxone. Later, endogenous endorphins were discovered by applying pig brain cell homegenate to the apparatus. This caused the contractions to cease.  The degree to which an opiate agonist inhibits contractions of the mouse vas deferens, and other tissues like the guinea pig ileum, is highly correlated to its potency as an analgesic.

Awards, honours and tribute
1951 Fellow of the Royal Society of Edinburgh
1976 Schmiedeberg Plakette, German Pharmacological Society
1977 Pacesetter award (US National Institute on Drug Abuse)
1977 Scheele Award
1978 Fellow of the Royal Society of London
Nathan B. Eddy Award
Albert Lasker Award
1979 Baly Medal, Royal College of Physicians
Royal Medal, Royal Society of London
1980 MacDougal–Brisbane Prize, Royal Society of Edinburgh
Honorary membership, British Pharmacological Society
1981 Fellow of the Royal College of Physicians of Edinburgh
Feldberg Prize
Harvey Prize, Technion – Israel Institute of Technology
1982 Sherrington Memorial Medal, Royal Society of Medicine
1983 The Dautrebande Prize,  Académie Royale de Médecine de Belgique
1984 Honorary membership, The Physiological Society
1985 Foreign Associate, National Academy of Sciences
1987 Wellcome Gold Medal, British Pharmacological Society
1988 Cameron Prize for Therapeutics of the University of Edinburgh
2010 The Kosterlitz Centre at the University of Aberdeen, opened on 16 September 2010, is named in his honour.

In his 1998 tribute, former colleague and friend Dr Gordon M Lees said of Kosterlitz

“[He] was a quiet, rather modest man, who was greatly respected, both as a scientist and as a person of real courage, honour, judgement, polite manners, and inflexible integrity of conduct and consistency of principle.”

References

1903 births
1996 deaths
Fellows of the Royal Society
Alumni of the University of Aberdeen
Academics of the University of Aberdeen
Royal Medal winners
Recipients of the Albert Lasker Award for Basic Medical Research
British biochemists
German emigrants to Scotland
German biochemists
Physicians from Berlin
20th-century British medical doctors
Naturalised citizens of the United Kingdom
Jewish emigrants from Nazi Germany to the United Kingdom
Foreign associates of the National Academy of Sciences
People interned in the Isle of Man during World War II